Halligattu  is a village in the southern state of Karnataka, India. It is located in the Virajpet taluk of Kodagu district.

Demographics
 India census, Halligattu had a population of 5658 with 2956 males and 2702 females.

See also
 Kodagu
 Districts of Karnataka

References

External links
 http://Kodagu.nic.in/

Villages in Kodagu district